Sirius Real Estate is a large property company investing in German business parks. It is listed on the London Stock Exchange and is a constituent of the FTSE 250 Index.

History
The company was launched on the Alternative Investment Market in February 2007. The company had acquired 40 business parks in Germany by the time it transferred to the main market in March 2017.

Operations
The company's investment portfolio was valued at £2.1 billion as at 31 March 2022.

References

Real estate companies established in 2007
Companies listed on the London Stock Exchange